Venus of Buret' may refer to any of the five Venus figurines found from archeological site of Buret' in Siberia near Irkutsk and the Angara river valley.

Four of them are made of ivory and one of them is made of serpentine. One of the figurines (pictured) made of ivory depicts a shrouded person. A similar shrouded figurine has been found from Mal'ta. Carvings on the figurine might represent decorated clothes. The figurine is partially sexually ambiguous due to lack of breasts, but it has an emphasized pubic triangle and vaginal area.

Venus figurines by Mal'ta-Buret' culture of the area are considered to be geographically isolated. They have features that differ from other Venuses of the Paleolithic era, as they have clothes, instead of being nude, and they also have elaborately carved faces.

List of artifacts

See also

Art of the Upper Paleolithic
Gravettian
Mikhail M. Gerasimov
Venus figurines of Mal'ta

References

Further reading

Gerasimov, Michail M. (1964). The Paleolithic site of Malta: excavations of 1956–1958. In E.N. Michael (ed.): The Archaeology and Geomorphology of Northern Asia. No. 5, S. 3–32, Arctic Institute of North America, University of Toronto.

External links
The Mal'ta - Buret' venuses and culture in Siberia
The era of the great European cultures of the Northern - type hunters (including a reconstruction of clothing from a similar figurine)

Buret'
Archaeology of Siberia
Ivory works of art
Irkutsk Oblast
Archaeological discoveries in Russia
Gravettian